Bratislava-Vrakuňa railway station is a railway station on railway line 131 in Bratislava-Vrakuňa. The station was opened in 1895 but closed in 1974. It was reopened on 15 October 2016.

This train station connects four train stations: Bratislava main railway station, Kvetoslavov, Dunajská Streda and Komárno.

Services

Public transport 
Public transport is from Railway street bus stop:

  Astronomic street – Vineyard street

  Čiližská street – Hazel/Poplar

Intercity transport is from Píniová street bus stop:

  The central bus station – Wolfs

  The central bus station – Gold spikes, Rastice, Jednota shop

  The central bus station – New life, Vojtechovce/Čenkovce, culture house

References 

Railway stations in Bratislava
Railway stations in Slovakia
Railway stations opened in 1895
Railway stations opened in 2016
Railway stations closed in 1974
Railway stations in Slovakia opened in the 19th century